Lisa Nystrand (born 15 May 2006) is a Swedish competitive swimmer. At the 2022 European Aquatics Championships, she placed tenth in the semifinals of the 200-metre individual medley and twelfth in the 400-metre individual medley. She placed fourteenth in the semifinals of the 200-metre backstroke at the 2021 European Short Course Championships. At the 2021 European Junior Championships, she placed sixth in the final of the 200-metre individual medley, eighth in the final of the 400-metre individual medley, and tenth in the semifinals of the 200-metre breaststroke.

Background
Nystrand was born 15 May 2006 in Sweden and competes for Väsby SS.

Career

2020–2021
In June 2020, at the senior Swedish National Championships, conducted in a virtual format, Nystrand won gold medals and nationals titles in the 200-metre breaststroke, 200-metre individual medley, and 400-metre individual medley, as well as a silver medal in the 200-metre backstroke. The following year, in April at the Swedish Swim Open, she qualified for her first senior LEN European Aquatics Championships at 15 years of age, achieving a qualifying time of 2:15.46 in the 200-metre individual medley for both the senior and junior European Championships of the year. Her time of 2:15.46 was 1.08 seconds faster than the Olympic selection time in the event for the 2020 Summer Olympics (2:16.54) and was achieved before the end of the qualifying period, which closed on 27 June.

At the 2020 European Aquatics Championships, held in May at Danube Arena in Budapest, Hungary, Nystrand placed 26th in the 200-metre individual medley with a time of 2:16.34, which was again faster than the 2020 Summer Olympics selection time and was attained in the qualifying period. In her other event, the 200-metre backstroke, she placed 28th, finishing in a time of 2:17.50. While her 200-metre individual medley times from April (2:15.46) and May (2:16.34) were both faster than the Olympic selection time of 2:16.54 and were both attained before 27 June, the International Olympic Committee invited no female Swedish swimmers to compete in the event for Team Sweden at the 2020 Olympic Games. Two months later, in July at the 2021 European Junior Swimming Championships held in Rome, Italy, she placed sixth in the final of the 200-metre individual medley with a 2:15.08, eighth in the final of the 400-metre individual medley with a 4:50.04, tenth in the semifinals of the 200-metre breaststroke with a personal best time of 2:31.65, fourteenth in the 4×100-metre medley relay, swimming the backstroke leg of the relay, 34th in the 100-metre backstroke with a 1:05.70, and did not start the 200-metre backstroke.

For the 2021 European Short Course Swimming Championships, contested at the Palace of Water Sports in Kazan, Russia in November, Nystrand achieved a fourteenth-place finish in the semifinals of the 200-metre backstroke with a personal best time of 2:09.85, after a personal best time of 2:10.78 in the preliminary heats, and a seventeenth-place finish in the 200-metre individual medley with a personal best time of 2:13.16. She also placed sixteenth in the 400-metre individual medley with a personal best time of 4:41.12.

2022
The following year, as a 16-year-old at the 2022 European Junior Swimming Championships held in July in Otopeni, Romania, Nystrand competed in seven events, including placing fourth in the final of the 200-metre individual medley with a 2:14.84, fourth in the final of the 400-metre individual medley with a 4:47.65, twelfth in the semifinals of the 200-metre backstroke with a personal best time of 2:17.13, and 20th in the 200-metre breaststroke with a 2:35.54.

2022 European Aquatics Championships
At the 2022 European Aquatics Championships, held in August at Foro Italico in Rome, Italy, Nystrand placed 25th in her first event of the Championships, the 200-metre backstroke, with a time of 2:17.84. In her second event, the 400-metre individual medley, she placed twelfth with a time of 4:50.40. For her third and final event of the Championships, the 200-metre individual medley, she advanced past the preliminaries for the first time at a LEN European Aquatics Championships, qualifying for the evening semifinals. In the semifinals of the event, she placed tenth with a personal best time of 2:14.64 and did not qualify for the final.

International championships (50 m)

International championships (25 m)

Personal best times

Long course metres (50 m pool)

Legend: h – preliminary heat; sf – semifinal

Short course metres (25 m pool)

Legend: h – preliminary heat; sf – semifinal

References

External links
 

2006 births
Living people
Swedish female medley swimmers
Swedish female backstroke swimmers
Swedish female breaststroke swimmers